The Russky Bridge (Russian Bridge) is a cable-stayed bridge in Vladivostok, Primorsky Krai, Russia. The bridge connects the Russky Island and the Muravyov-Amursky Peninsula sections of the city across the Eastern Bosphorus strait, and with a central span of  it is the longest cable-stayed bridge in the world. The Russky Bridge was originally built to serve the 2012 Asia-Pacific Economic Cooperation conference hosted at the Far Eastern Federal University campus on Russky Island. It was completed in July 2012 and opened by Prime Minister Dmitry Medvedev, and on September 3, 2012, the bridge was officially given its name.

Overview

The bridge also has the second highest pylons after the Millau Viaduct and the longest cable stays.

The design of the bridge crossing has been determined on the basis of two primary factors:
Shortest coast-to-coast distance in the bridge crossing location .

Pylons construction

A crane was used on the first three pours, afterwards the formwork was completed unaided moving through the hydraulic motion of modular elements.

The pylons are A-shaped, therefore, the use of standard forms was not feasible. An individual set of forms was arranged for each bridge tower.

The use of self-climbing forms made it possible to achieve better quality and decrease the time of construction of cast-in-situ reinforced concrete structures by half as much again.

The installation of cable stay pairs and casting of bridge tower bodies was carried out simultaneously, dramatically reducing the construction period.

Central span structure
The span structure has an aerodynamic cross-section to assume squally wind loads. The shape of the span cross-section has been determined based on aerodynamic design and optimized according to the results of experimental processing of the scale model in the detailed design phase.

Welded field connections are used for longitudinal and transversal joints of the cap sheet of the orthotropic deck and lower ribbed plate. For joints of vertical walls of the blocks, longitudinal ribs, transversal beams and diaphragms, field connections are used provided by means of high-strength bolts.

Large-sized prefabricated sections for the installation of the central span were delivered by barges to the erection site and hoisted by a crane to a  height. Here, the elements were abutted and cable stays attached to them.

Cable-stayed system

A cable-stayed system assumes all static and dynamic loads on which the very existence of the bridge depends. Cable stays are not designed to endure the entire lifetime of the bridge, but they are repairable and have the best possible protection from natural disasters and other adverse impacts.

Parallel strand stay (PSS) cable stays consist of parallel strands of  diameter; every strand consists of seven galvanized wires. Cable stays incorporate from 13 to 79 strands. The protective housings of the cable stays are made from high density polyethylene (HDPE) and have the following features: UV resistance; resistance to local climate conditions of Vladivostok (temperature range from –40 to +40 °C; –40 to +104 °F) and environmental aggressiveness.

Bridge specification

Bridge footprint: 60+72+3x84+1104+3x84+72+60 m
Total bridge length: 
Total length incl. trestles: 
Central channel span length: 
Bridge width: 
Bridge roadway breadth: 
Number of driving lanes: 4 (two in each direction)
Under clearance: 
Number of bridge towers: 2
Pylons’ height: 
Number of cable stays: 168
Longest cable stay:  
Shortest cable stay:

Criticism

The costs and the fact of the construction of the Russky Bridge are widely criticized by the Russian political opposition. In January 2007, Vladimir Putin, then-President of Russia, stated that holding a summit in Vladivostok is a distinct possibility, and that at least 100 billion rubles would be required to prepare the city for the summit, which, at the time, was three times more than the provincial budget of Primorsky Krai as a whole. , the cost of construction was expected to surpass $1 billion USD, and the project description on the site of the general contractor did not list project costs. Additionally, the built-in capacity of 50,000 cars per day is ten-times the existing population of Russky Island at only 5,000 inhabitants, leading to severe under-usage.

There had previously been criticism that the paved road had ended in a dead end, a short distance beyond the bridge, during the first year after it was built. The paved road network has since then been expanded. As of 2018, the road covers the entire Sapper peninsula, about 25% of the total area of the island.

References

External links

Construction of the bridge to Russky Island: news and photos from start until today
 Russian Bridge completed over the Eastern Bosphorus Strait (photo) (Русский мост сомкнулся над проливом Босфор Восточный (фото))

Buildings and structures in Vladivostok
Transport in Vladivostok
Cable-stayed bridges in Russia
Cross-sea bridges in Asia
Road bridges in Russia
Bridges completed in 2012
2012 establishments in Russia
Pacific Coast of Russia